Tăuteşti may refer to:

Tăuteşti, a village in Ungureni Commune, Botoşani County, Romania
Tăuteşti, a village in Rediu Commune, Iaşi County, Romania
Tăuteşti, a village in Zamostea Commune, Suceava County, Romania

See also
Tăuţi (disambiguation)
Tóth (disambiguation)